Dr Dave Geaney is an All-Ireland medal holder (1959 and 1962). He played in his first All-Ireland final in 1959 at the age of 19 having played schoolboys rugby for Munster earlier in the year. He played in the All-Ireland semi-final in 1962 against Dublin.He played in 3 Munster finals. He was manager of the Castleisland Desmonds Senior team for a good number of years and was trainer when they won the All-Ireland Club title in 1985 when they defeated St. Vincent's (Dublin)  in the final on St. Patrick's Day. He was manager  for the glory period of Desmonds, and highlights include first North Kerry Senior Football Championship win, Intermediate and club championship wins, two All-Ireland club finals in a row (1984 and 1985) as well as being manager for Desmonds only county final appearance in a county final when they were beaten by eventual All-Ireland Champions, Dr. Crokes. He was also manager of Castleisland District team in the 1979 County final.  Geaney was a Kerry GAA medical officer from 1975 to 2012.  He was named by new Kerry manager Pat O'Shea as a selector for the 2007 All-Ireland Senior Football Championship.
Kerry won the 2007 championship and reached the 2008 final.

GAA family
Geaney is the son of Con Geaney, a member of the Kerry team that won the 1932 All-Ireland Senior Football Championship. In 1976 his sister, Mary Geaney, captained Kerry when they won the All-Ireland Senior Ladies' Football Championship and in 1980 she captained Cork when they won the All-Ireland Senior Camogie Championship. She is also a former Ireland women's field hockey international.

References

Year of birth missing (living people)
Living people
Castleisland Gaelic footballers
Gaelic football selectors
Kerry inter-county Gaelic footballers